Marwa Jawhar  is an Egyptian writer and novelist. She first worked as a flight attendant and then became a writer. Marwa studied Film Directing in the Egyptian castle in Cairo and participated in a lot of short fiction and documentary films. She wrote pieces in Al-Ain magazine and Al-Dastour newspaper and she still writes regularly on online websites.

About the writer 
Marwa Jawhar's first ever book was "Cut to the chase" published in 2013 where she took all that she wrote in Al-Ain magazine and Al-Dastour newspaper and gathered it in a book that talks about the psychological and emotional aspects of the Egyptian culture and the economical problems that may face the Egyptian resident in a light and fun way. She specializes in horror literature, where most of her books are about strange and horror plots.  She also had a book under the name "The flight attendant 13" published in 2015, and "Happens at night in the closed room" which is her first ever novel to be produced as a cinematic work. Currently, she published her novel "talisman house". She often writes based on true stories horror literature from events that happened to her personally.

The author's books 

 "Cut to the chase" published in 2013
 "The flight attendant 13" published in 2015
 "Happens at night in the closed room" published in 2018
 "talisman house" published in 2019
 "The black sleep" published in 2020 
 "The building of Al-Daod" published in 2021

References 

Egyptian writers
Year of birth missing (living people)
Living people
Egyptian novelists
Egyptian women writers